Kekal (sometimes stylized as KEKAL) is a heavy metal and electronic music band formed in 1995 in Jakarta, Indonesia. According to AllMusic, Kekal was one of the first heavy metal bands from Indonesia to make international inroads, and according to sociologist of heavy metal, Keith Kahn-Harris, was one of the few extreme metal bands from Southeast Asia to ever make more than a minimal impression on the global scene. Founded by two musicians known simply Yeris and Newbabe, the band underwent some shifts in lineup in its early years, but emerged with a consistent lineup of three key-members, guitarist/vocalist Jeff Arwadi, bassist Azhar Levi Sianturi, and guitarist Leo Setiawan. Frequently labeled as black metal, progressive metal, and avant-garde metal, Kekal plays a very diverse range of music styles within the frame of metal and rock, incorporating many other music genres such as ambient, electronic, jazz fusion, and progressive rock. Over the course of its career, Kekal has transitioned from a heavy metal-based style to a more experimental and electronic sound.

Throughout its entire career, the band has released thirteen full-length studio albums, four EPs, several compilations and contributions to various collaborative albums, and in 2004 engaged in a successful European mini-tour. As of 12 August 2009, all key-members have officially left Kekal, but continue to contribute material. Though the band currently has no official members, former members of the band contributed to six more studio albums so far, sometimes anonymously, including their twelfth studio album Quantum Resolution in 2020, and their thirteenth album Envisaged in 2022.

History

Early years (formation to 2002)
The early history of Kekal started out in 1990, when 16-year-old musician Jeff Arwadi formed a self-styled "punkish thrash metal" band called Obliteration with some of his high school friends, but Jeff quit this group in 1991 to better learn guitar. Kekal was officially formed on 15 August 1995, by two friends, simply named under pseudonyms Yeris and Newbabe (the latter revealed years later as Newin Atmarumeksa), as a more straightforward extreme metal band. The name Kekal was coined by Newbabe, and is Indonesian for 'Immortal' or 'Eternal'. The band was intended as a one time project, and recruited a vocalist known simply as "Harry" to help record a four-song demo tape. This demo began to circulate and caught the attention of future guitarist Leo, who had gained experience in a Metallica and Megadeth cover band.

In June 1996, Azhar Sianturi joined Kekal and the band recorded its official demo, entitled Contra Spiritualia Nequitiae, using the songwriting and production talents of Jeff Arwadi, who was also a member of the group Inner Warfare. According to Jeff, the demo was recorded in his bedroom with only a Fostex X-28 4-track tape recorder and $2 karaoke microphone. With the help of underground tape trading circles and local fanzines, the demo soon caught the attention of the metal scene outside Indonesia and Southeast Asia, and few record labels began offering deals. Later that year Leo Setiawan joined the band, and in April 1997 Kekal began to record its self-produced debut album, Beyond the Glimpse of Dreams, released in 1998. The album was licensed to and released by two record labels, allowing for Kekal to be known internationally, especially in the underground metal circles around Europe and North America. Harry left the band after this recording, and the remaining trio released Embrace the Dead the next year. Jeff has expressed disappointment with this album, both in the stylistic direction, which was intentionally designed to appeal to a more mainstream audience, and in the recording sessions, which would inspire the title of the band's next album, The Painful Experience. The following year the band contributed to a Living Sacrifice tribute album with a cover of that band's song "Mind Distant". In October 2001, the band's third album, The Painful Experience, was released. Leo Setiawan left the band before the recording sessions and moved to Melbourne, Australia, but he was still listed on the album credits as a guitarist due to his contribution on the album's songwriting and general concept. In 2002, the band was reduced to a duo, and collaborated with the Dutch band Slechtvalk to record a split album entitled Chaos & Warfare, and also recorded a cover of "God Rest Ye Merry Gentlemen" for the compilation album Brutal Christmas: The Season in Chaos.

International scene (2003–2006)
 In 2003, with the absence of Leo as a guitarist, the remaining members Jeff and Azhar Levi recorded a cover song "Dance Macabre" for a well received Cradle of Filth tribute album entitled Covered in Filth, and shortly after they released the highly progressive and experimental 1000 Thoughts of Violence which was also well received, being rated eight out of ten by Rock Hard and was regarded as a highlight of the year 2003 by Powermetal.de. A best-of collection of works and re-recordings of Kekal entitled Introduce Us to Immortality was also released that year. Also that year, Kekal received notice by the Antwerp-based radio show "Psych Folk" Radio on Radio Centraal, being referred to in that show's programs on progressive music in Indonesia. The success of 1000 Thoughts of Violence was followed up by a two-week European mini-tour, arranged and promoted by the band's record label in Europe at the time, Fear Dark. In March 2004, the band played a string of shows in the Netherlands, Germany and Sweden, and was featured in the Dutch magazine Aardschok. That year also saw the release of Spirits of the Ancient Days, a collection of early Kekal demo songs. 
Upon return to Indonesia, Kekal was back in the studio to record a fifth album Acidity which included guest musician Didi Priyadi on guitars, as well as playing some local shows with him as an additional live guitarist. Acidity was released in 2005 and was an official reunion album for the band, which marked the return of Leo, and a vocal contribution by founding member Newbabe. Acidity was well received, and Kekal was again noted by "Psych Folk" Radio. In 2006, the band started recording their sixth album, The Habit of Fire. In 2006, Jeff leaked two cover songs, "The Prow", originally by Voivod, and "Juices Like Wine", originally by Celtic Frost, both of which were recorded in 2005.

Jeff's move to Canada (2006–2008)
In 2006, right after the recording of The Habit of Fire, founding member Jeff Arwadi moved to Canada while the rest of the members were in Indonesia, leaving the band unable to play shows and do touring. At the same time they left their longtime record label Fear Dark and status of the band was in question. After few months of uncertainty and rumors of break-up went around among their fans, they all decided to remain together and to keep the band only as a studio project. They quickly signed licensing deals with two record labels to release The Habit of Fire in 2007. The album was received very well and was named CD of the Month by UK's music technology magazine Sound on Sound, as well as being nominated as The Best Avantgarde Metal Album in 2007 by Metal Storm. In 2007, Jeff leaked another cover tune, "Redemption", that originally was planned as part of a Johnny Cash tribute album by Open Grave Records, a project that was ultimately shelved. Later in 2007, Jeff announced on the band's Myspace blog that a new Kekal album was on the way, which he had been working on all by himself.  It was revealed later on that the new album was entitled Audible Minority, and it was meant to be released officially on 25 December 2008 as two versions: a free download and a limited edition Digipak with total 11 songs including a cover of the A-ha song "Locust". Unfortunately the Digipak version was never released, and the album ended up being offered only as a free download instead.

Departure of band members (2009)
In March 2009, Azhar Levi decided to step down from Kekal. Jeff Arwadi said that although this closed a door, Kekal would continue as a musical unit in a "new era" of the band's history. On 12 August 2009, Jeff announced that he and Leo had left Kekal, and that the name would continue but without active members. He said that, as well as unspecified personal reasons, he decided to leave the band because, after being closer to nature and in a less densely populated city in Canada, he was unable to continue to make dark and angry metal music which he did in the past with Kekal. Shortly after, Kekal put up an offer of three albums for free download on its website, including its best-selling album to date, 1000 Thoughts of Violence.

Many of its fans perceived that Kekal had technically split-up/disbanded at the moment band leader Jeff announced his departure from the band, despite the fact that Kekal as an institution still existed and the institution itself was not affected by any founding member leaving. To end the confusions among the fans, the band issued a statement posted on its official Facebook page: "KEKAL IS NOT DEAD!!!! When Jeff left Kekal it doesn't mean the band is dead!" The band's MySpace and Facebook pages are still active and currently being moderated mainly by volunteers from the band's Street Team members, as well as Azhar and Jeff themselves.

Current activity (2010–present)
 On 13 January 2010, Kekal announced that a new album was in the works, and that former members Jeff, Leo, and Levi were all contributing. Then, on 15 February, Jeff posted a music video on his YouTube channel for an, at that time, untitled new album. The music video was for a song entitled "Tabula Rasa", which was also released for streaming. On 23 June 2010, the band announced on its Myspace and Facebook that it would release its eighth album entitled 8 in late 2010, and that further details would be forthcoming.

On 15 August 2010, a remastered, limited-edition version of the band's second album, Embrace the Dead, was released as a free-download for up 1000 downloads in celebration of the band's 15-year anniversary.

Kekal's newest album, 8, was made available for pre-order on 22 December 2010 by Whirlwind Records, which included an offer of free shipping within Europe up to 24 December. The album was released on 23 January 2011.

On 2 March 2011, Jeff Arwadi announced on the Kekal Facebook page that he and Leo were recording new music, and said that another album would probably be released sometime in 2012. On 2 April, Kekal announced that a download-only EP would be released in June or July, and would contain two brand new tracks recorded in 2011, as well as separate guitar and vocal tracks of "Tabula Rasa" for the purpose of remixing by the general public. On 26 April, Jeff uploaded a music video for the song "Futuride" from the upcoming EP, which was promised to be released in July. The official release date for the album, 10 July 2011, was announced over Facebook on 23 June 2011. The title of the EP was Futuride EP, and three tracks from the album were made available for public use under Creative Commons Attribution Non-Commercial Share Alike license. On 24 February 2012, Kekal announced the title of its ninth studio album, Autonomy, and the album was released on 19 December 2012, first as a limited, hand-numbered deluxe-edition double-CD with the 2008 album Audible Minority (which was previously never released on CD) added as a bonus disc. On 29 June 2013, Autonomy was released by Indonesian netlabel Yes No Wave Music as a free digital download, but restricted to Indonesian market only.

On 19 March 2013 Kekal released a surprise EP, Unsung Division EP, announced the 10th full-length Kekal album, Multilateral, would be released in 2015, and the possibility of a second EP in late 2013 or 2014. The Unsung Division EP consisted of songs originally written for the 2015 album, but removed as the "some compositions turned out to be a bit out-of-place with the rest of the album's general concept," according to Arwadi. In 2017, the band announced a new album for 2018, entitled Deeper Underground.

Music

Style

Although mainly known as a progressive metal and avant-garde or experimental metal band, Kekal has stylistic origins in extreme metal, particularly black metal, but even with its debut album the band demonstrated a unique style. Beyond the Glimpse of Dreams featured a varied sound of black and death metal and incorporated a range of vocal styles such as high pitched black metal shrieks, death growls, and female singing. On Embrace the Dead, Kekal used a combination of black metal with death, classic, and doom metal elements and included hints of Gothic and dark wave. The third album, The Painful Experience, saw the band fusing its black metal style with progressive metal and included elements of thrash, classic, and power metal. Mark Allan Powell described that most of the band's songs were midtempo to fast with a heavy, guitar-driven style, though the band incorporated "certain elements of variety into the sound." In a 2001 interview, Jeff expressed ambivalence to what style the band was described as, as long as it was "metal". On its fourth, highly technical album, 1000 Thoughts of Violence, the band plunged into ultra-progressive experiments, The album was noted for switching between raging intensity and more mellow passages, such as the song "Violent Society", which even included a hip-hop passage. Powermetal.de noted that the band had become more progressive and lost some of its toughness and aggression. "Psych Folk" Radio viewed the album favorably, mentioning that 1000 Thoughts of Violence "is a possibility to invite progressive rock listeners to take the challenge to open up their perspectives." In March 2004, Aardschok Magazine described the band's albums as a mix of black, heavy, and progressive metal, being grounded in the extreme metal scene.

On its well received fifth album, Acidity, Kekal used double bass drum blasts and saw the band incorporating styles such as electronic, black metal, progressive metal, progressive rock, classic rock, indie rock, psychedelic rock, trip hop, jazz, ambient, and avant-garde. Jeff Arwadi responded to the "avant-garde" label in an interview with Ultimate Metal.com: "For us, avant-garde is not a classification of music. It is a state of being, a state of becoming... ...once your music can be classified easily, I don't think the word progressive or avant-garde fits. So that's why we mention in our bio that 'avant-garde' is an ideal state for us, and not a classification."
On the next album, The Habit of Fire, the band maintained its use of various music styles such as electronica, ambient, and jazz fusion, but began to shed its black metal roots and introduced atmospheric soundscapes and an industrial vibe. Pop Matters described the album as mixing black metal, noise rock, progressive rock, and jazz fusion. With the 2010 album 8, the first album by the band without any active members, Metal Hammer Germany noted that the band was now far away from its early black metal days. Powermetal.de described the band as avant-garde tinged post-rock, with the album being predominantly electronic, but stated that "experimental" was the simplest description of the album. The reviewer, Björn Backes, made comparisons to The Prodigy and The Chemical Brothers and noted the use of "weird" arrangements, post-rock mood swings and alternative guitar sound. Sonic Seducer called the album simply avant-garde and described the band as loving triplets, polyrhythms, and complex beats.

Influences
Kekal has identified itself with the punk rock and early 1980s metal scenes, and considers itself a "street-progressive" band that is aesthetically more akin to Sonic Youth or The Mars Volta than to technically oriented bands like Dream Theater. The band claims roots in 1980s forms of heavy metal as pioneered by bands like Iron Maiden, Bathory, Trouble, Helloween, Celtic Frost, Sodom, Death, and Massacre. Dimebag Darrell and Quorthon have also been cited as influences.

Currently, Kekal has cited an influence from many styles of music and now lists a large host of artists as an inspiration, including A-ha, Amebix, Autechre, Björk, Black Sabbath, Bohren & der Club of Gore, Camel, Celtic Frost, Cocteau Twins, Chick Corea, The Cure, Miles Davis, Depeche Mode, Discharge, Duran Duran, Gazebo, Godflesh, Iron Maiden, Joy Division, Killing Joke, King Crimson, Led Zeppelin, Mantronix, Massive Attack, Curtis Mayfield, Merzbow, Pat Metheny, Wes Montgomery, Gary Moore, Napalm Death, Outkast, Pan Sonic, Paradise Lost, Parliament, Pet Shop Boys, Pink Floyd, The Police, Portishead, Radiohead, Red Snapper, Return to Forever, Rush, Sonic Youth, Squarepusher, Talk Talk, Tangerine Dream, Amon Tobin, Trouble, and Voivod.

Songwriting and recording techniques
Jeff has stated that starting from the album The Painful Experience they incorporated their own approach to record drum tracks in the studio which they call "hybrid drums", a mix of real-time performance and software-based matrix programming. He also mentioned the efficiency of using the hybrid drumming compared with getting a drummer: "About the drummer, it is still very hard to find a right drummer because Kekal music is ranging from very extreme-metal with blast beats and fast double-kicks, to powerful rock beats that demand steady tempo, and to some polyrhythmic playing and time-signature shifts in the characteristics of jazz and prog drumming. We would need 2 or 3 kinds of drummer for Kekal. That's why the best thing for the recording is to make the hybrid drumming." In other interview, Jeff mentioned the process of recording of The Habit of Fire, starting from collecting samples and creating MIDI information, then manipulating the sounds to create what he called the 'skeleton'. Then riffs, MIDI-triggered instruments, synthesizers, and melodies would be added and the structure re-arranged once again. Once the song structure was set, the guitars would be re-recorded, then bass and drum tracks would be put on top, then vocals. Jeff also mentioned during the interview about the 2011 Futuride EP, that he has experimented with additive synthesis on the recent songs he has recorded and uses guitars to counterbalance the sounds generated by the additive synthesis.

Ethics and ideological stance

Kekal and anarchism
Kekal claims to have practiced anarchism since the beginning of its career, which in their own words "translates to non-hierarchical and anti-authoritarian approach to self-governing/self-managing", including voluntary contribution, free association and a strong DIY ethic. Kekal never grants copyrights of the band's recording masters to any record labels (since 2010 all the music have been published through Creative Commons license) and has 100% artistic control over music, production and artwork. Kekal has recorded and produced most of its albums in its own studio/workstation, manages the band itself, does its own photo sessions, and designs its own album artwork and covers. As Jeff stated, "So far, we've been known as an independent band who never want to get signed by record label, to maintain our independency and control over our artistic freedom, and also to own our recording masters and copyright.. Instead of band signing, we always prefer to license our finished albums to record labels."

Kekal and Christianity
Kekal has been described by AllMusic as one of the first black metal bands to profess Christian beliefs. However, the band has stated on its Facebook page that as an institution it is not a Christian metal band and does not endorse any particular religion or ideology. Known to have fans from different religious backgrounds, and with the majority of their listeners being non-Christians, the band has always maintained that it is about music, life, and universality, and stands against any form of elitism and exclusivism in today's culture. In a 2020 interview with Metal Storm, Jeff Arwadi explained in details regarding why he does not see Christian metal as something that makes sense to him: "It started from the religious circles, from the organized youths' fellowships within the church scene because they wanted the kids to listen mainly to the music that is "safe" for them, and depending on the level of tolerance of each organization, some would restrict these kids to listen to anything that has "Christian" content only, so it's how the branding came about. Then later on, as these kids were looking around for any music with the Christian content, some players within the music industry started to see how they could also create the box, which they could also play around and make good chunks of money by keeping as many people as possible within that box by signing "Christian bands", either real or posers, of various genres exclusively as "the safe alternative to these kids" and kept them away from listening to other bands that they perceive as "harmful", and built the exclusive scene instead of reaching out. It is very easy for them to market within a specific target audience who only listen to one particular type of music out of fear, especially if the number of people within the religious belt is large enough to exploit, like in the U.S. for example, where so-called "Christian bands" could make a living just from playing in churches and youth summer camps across the country. It's pretty much like an alternative world that is disconnected to the main one. I found it to be silly and tragic at the same time, but it's how the whole religious business works over there." In another interview, Jeff added his point on Kekal's stance as a band: "...we are non-conformists, musical anarchists. We hate being trendy and we never try to be the same with the rest of the scene. People can love us or hate us, I don't care."

The band's lyrical material for the 2020 album entitled Quantum Resolution has many Gnostic Christian references from the Nag Hammadi library writings such as Gospel of Thomas, also another noncanonical scripture known as Gospel of Mary, and the recognition regarding the world and this material universe as holographic or projection.

Jeff Arwadi, in particular, has expressed his belief in Christianity that is not a religion. During the 2017 interview, he considered himself as a Christian Anarchist, and mentioned that he personally opposes the concept of religion, its dogma and hierarchical structure of authority within the church organization. The lyrics on the song called "Rotten in The House" reflect his opposition, which he describes in a 2018 interview: "Oftentimes, people choose to involve deeply into religion not because they want spiritual growth, but just to get away from the life of misery that they experience everyday, an escapism, so that they can 'reverse' their experience to become somewhat 'positive' for them and even 'empower' them. It's almost the same as the use of drugs in order to make you relax, to 'help' you get a good sleep, get high and forget all the problems for a moment. But the danger is also present, like in drugs, religion could become an addictive agent. Its application could gradually damage human sanity, common-sense and conscience."  Søren Kierkegaard is cited as a big influence in shaping his concept of faith and spirituality. In one interview, Jeff clarified that for him personally, faith is something that drives the human life, and, just like diet and exercise, does not have to be associated with religion whatsoever.

Members

Former members
Jeff Arwadi (Altera Enigma, Armageddon Holocaust, Doctor D, Excision, Inner Warfare) – guitar, vocals, programming, drum machine, samples & loops (1995–2009)
Azhar Levi Sianturi (Mournphagy) – bass, vocals (1996–2009)
Leo Setiawan – guitar (1996–2001, 2005–2009)
Harry – vocals (1995–1998)
 Newin "Newbabe" Atmarumeksa – bass, vocals (1995–1996, 2004–2005)
Yeris – guitar, vocals (1995–1996)

Guest musicians
Didi Priyadi (Happy Day, In Memoriam) – session and live guitar, live vocals
Kenny Cheong (Altera Enigma, Soundscape) – fretless bass
Jason DeRon (Paramaecium, Altera Enigma, inExordium) – guitar
Doctor D (Armageddon Holocaust, Doctor D, Bealiah) – vocals, noises and samples, programming
Safrina Christina (Excision) – vocals, keyboards, programming
Hans Kurniawan (Inner Warfare) – keyboard
Habil Kurnia – keyboards, engineering, mixing
Julie – female vocals
Hana – female vocals
Vera – female vocals

Timeline
Note: As of 8 August 2009, Kekal has no active members, but former members continue to record and contribute content for the band.

Discography

 Beyond the Glimpse of Dreams – 1998
 Embrace the Dead – 1999
 The Painful Experience – 2001
 1000 Thoughts of Violence – 2003
 Acidity – 2005
 The Habit of Fire – 2007
 Audible Minority – 2008
 8 – 2010
 Autonomy – 2012
 Multilateral - 2015
 Deeper Underground - 2018
 Quantum Resolution - 2020
 Envisaged - 2022

See also
 List of Indonesian rock bands

References

External links

Indonesian heavy metal musical groups
Avant-garde metal musical groups
Progressive metal musical groups
Indonesian progressive rock groups
Indonesian hard rock musical groups
Indonesian black metal musical groups
Death metal musical groups
Thrash metal musical groups
Political music groups
Electronic music groups
Musical groups from Jakarta
Musical groups established in 1995
Indonesian musical trios
Christian anarchists